The 2012–13 season was Sunderland's sixth consecutive season in the top division of English football, the Premier League. They finished the season in 17th place.

Pre-season

Friendlies

2012 Peace Cup
Sunderland, along with Eredivisie side Groningen, K-League side Seongnam, and Bundesliga side Hamburg, will compete in a friendly tournament, 2012 Peace Cup. All matches will be played at the Suwon World Cup Stadium in the Korean city of Suwon.

Premier League

League table

League Cup

FA Cup

Statistics

Appearances and goals

|-
|colspan="14"|Players that played for Sunderland this season that have left the club/are currently out on loan:

|}

Goalscorers

Overall

Players

Squad

Transfers

In

Out

Awards

Individual awards

See also
Sunderland A.F.C. seasons

References

2012-13
2012–13 Premier League by team